MUTV may refer to:

 Marquette University Television, an American student channel featuring student programming
 MUTV (Manchester United F.C.), a British subscription based television channel, operated by Manchester United F.C.